Harry Collins,  (born 13 June 1943), is a British sociologist of science at the School of Social Sciences, Cardiff University, Wales. In 2012 he was elected a Fellow of the British Academy.

Career 
While at the University of Bath Professor Collins developed the Bath School approach to the sociology of scientific knowledge.

In Changing Order: Replication and Induction in Scientific Practice, Collins outlines a general theory of sociology of science. Drawing from the concepts of "Language Game" and "Forms of Life", derived from the philosopher Ludwig Wittgenstein, he seeks an explanation for how scientists follow rules and patterns when performing experiments and scientific practice. Collins' perspective is usually called a relativist position, although this is a strong oversimplification.

Collins has written for over 30 years on the sociology of gravitational wave physics.  His publications in this area include: "The Seven Sexes: Study in Sociology of a Phenomenon, or Replication of Experiments in Physics" "Son of Seven Sexes: The Social Destruction of a Physical Phenomenon".  He has traced the search for gravitational waves, and has shown how scientific data can be subject to interpretative flexibility, and how social or 'non-scientific' means can be sometimes used to close scientific controversies.

At the beginning of the two thousands, Collins along with Dr Robert Evans, also of Cardiff University, has published works on what they term the "Third Wave of Science Studies" and, in particular, the idea of interactional expertise.  This aims to address questions of legitimacy and extension and public involvement in scientific decision-making. They continue to research and publish on this topic.

Selected works

Books 
 
 
Explains the nature and limits of intelligent machines, especially expert systems.
 
 
 
 
 
 
 
 
 Big Dog, Collins' next book on LIGO, was published as part of the paperback edition of Gravity's Ghost (2011), with a combined title.

Chapters in books

Journal articles

References

External links
Web page at University of Cardiff
The Expertise Network
Harry Collins's Gravitational Wave Project
 H. M. Collins at Library of Congress Authorities — with 16 catalogue records

1943 births
Academics of Cardiff University
Academics of the University of Bath
British sociologists
Living people
People from Penarth
Place of birth missing (living people)
Sociologists of science
Fellows of the British Academy